Samuel Kinghan OBE was a unionist politician in Northern Ireland.

Kinghan worked at Gallagher's Tobacco.  He became active in the Ulster Unionist Party and was elected to the Senate of Northern Ireland in 1963, serving until its abolition in 1973.  From 1965 to 1967, and again from 1971 to 1972, he was a Deputy Speaker of the Senate.

References

Year of birth missing
Possibly living people
Members of the Senate of Northern Ireland 1961–1965
Members of the Senate of Northern Ireland 1965–1969
Members of the Senate of Northern Ireland 1969–1973
Ulster Unionist Party members of the Senate of Northern Ireland